The 1997 Stockholm Open was an ATP men's tennis tournament played on indoor hard courts and held at the Kungliga tennishallen in Stockholm, Sweden. It was the 29th edition of the event and part of the ATP International Series of the 1997 ATP Tour. The tournament was held from 3 November through 9 November 1997. Jonas Björkman won the singles title.

Finals

Singles

 Jonas Björkman defeated  Jan Siemerink, 3–6, 7–6(7–2), 6–2, 6–4

Doubles

 Marc-Kevin Goellner /  Richey Reneberg defeated  Ellis Ferreira /  Patrick Galbraith, 6–3, 3–6, 7–6

References

External links
  
 ATP tournament profile
 ITF tournament edition details

 
Stockholm Open
Stockholm Open
1997 in Swedish tennis
November 1997 sports events in Europe
1990s in Stockholm